Sulphur Springs is an unincorporated community in LaSalle County, Illinois, United States.

References

Unincorporated communities in Illinois
Unincorporated communities in LaSalle County, Illinois
Ottawa, IL Micropolitan Statistical Area